Lorenzetti is an Italian surname. Notable people with the surname include:

Ambrogio Lorenzetti, Sienese painter
Enrico Lorenzetti (1911–1989), Italian moto GP racer of the 1940s and 1950s
Gustavo Lorenzetti (born 1985), Argentine footballer
Pietro Lorenzetti, Sienese painter, brother of Ambrogio Lorenzetti
Ricardo Lorenzetti, current president elect of the Argentine Supreme Court of Justice

Italian-language surnames
Patronymic surnames
Surnames from given names